Taurus Jabbar Sykes (born May 20, 1975) is a professional boxer.  He has been fighting as a heavyweight, and has fought against several contenders, and currently holds a record of 25–6–1. He turned pro in 1998.

Overview
Sykes, who hails from Brooklyn, is nicknamed "The Bull", due to his first name. Specifically, he hails from the Rutland Rd./the 90'z section of Brooklyn. He lost his 13th fight to unbeaten Owen Beck but that remained his only blemish on his record for a while in that he beat the likes of Israel Garcia (record 10-0), Charles Hatcher (15-2), Talmadge Griffis (21-1-3) and Sherman Williams to climb up the ladder. He drew with former Cruiser title holder Imamu Mayfield then beat Jovo Pudar (21-1) and even fringe contender Friday Ahunanya (20-2-1) in 2005. His only problem was his lack of power as only 7 of his first 25 wins have come the short route.

Undefeated KO artist Samuel Peter was the first to knock him out but lightly regarded southpaw Derek Bryant (18-4-1) also scored a TKO effectively ending any hopes of becoming a contender.

Former two-time heavyweight champ Hasim Rahman beat him in a 10-round decision.  He was knocked out by IBF #1 contender Alexander Povetkin in Moscow on July 19, 2008.

Professional boxing record

|-
|align="center" colspan=8|25 Wins (7 knockouts, 18 decisions), 7 Losses (4 knockouts, 3 decisions), 1 Draw 
|-
| align="center" style="border-style: none none solid solid; background: #e3e3e3"|Result
| align="center" style="border-style: none none solid solid; background: #e3e3e3"|Record
| align="center" style="border-style: none none solid solid; background: #e3e3e3"|Opponent
| align="center" style="border-style: none none solid solid; background: #e3e3e3"|Type
| align="center" style="border-style: none none solid solid; background: #e3e3e3"|Round
| align="center" style="border-style: none none solid solid; background: #e3e3e3"|Date
| align="center" style="border-style: none none solid solid; background: #e3e3e3"|Location
| align="center" style="border-style: none none solid solid; background: #e3e3e3"|Notes
|-align=center
|Loss
|
|align=left| Seth Mitchell
|KO
|5
|11/12/2010
|align=left| Mandalay Bay, Las Vegas, Nevada
|align=left|
|-
|Loss
|
|align=left| Joseph Rabotte
|SD
|8
|28/10/2010
|align=left| Township Auditorium, Columbia, South Carolina
|align=left|
|-
|Loss
|
|align=left| Alexander Povetkin
|TKO
|4
|19/07/2008
|align=left| Olimpyskiy Sports Palace, Chekhov, Moscow Oblast
|align=left|
|-
|Loss
|
|align=left| Hasim Rahman
|UD
|10
|14/06/2007
|align=left| Main Street Armory, Rochester, New York
|align=left|
|-
|Win
|
|align=left| Patrick Smith
|KO
|3
|01/12/2006
|align=left| Isleta Casino & Resort, Albuquerque, New Mexico
|align=left|
|-
|Loss
|
|align=left| Derek Bryant
|TKO
|4
|21/04/2006
|align=left| Augusta-Richmond County Civic Center, Augusta, Georgia
|align=left|
|-
|Win
|
|align=left| Domonic Jenkins
|UD
|8
|03/03/2006
|align=left| La Villita Assembly Hall, San Antonio, Texas
|align=left|
|-
|Loss
|
|align=left| Samuel Peter
|KO
|2
|02/07/2005
|align=left| Reno Events Center, Reno, Nevada
|align=left|
|-
|Win
|
|align=left| Friday Ahunanya
|UD
|12
|11/03/2005
|align=left| Lea County Events Center, Hobbs, New Mexico
|align=left|
|-
|Win
|
|align=left| Onebo Maxime
|TKO
|2
|10/12/2004
|align=left| Isleta Casino & Resort, Albuquerque, New Mexico
|align=left|
|-
|Win
|
|align=left| Jovo Pudar
|UD
|10
|21/02/2004
|align=left| City Center Pavilion, Reno, Nevada
|align=left|
|-
|Draw
|
|align=left| Imamu Mayfield
|PTS
|10
|07/06/2003
|align=left| Flamingo Laughlin, Laughlin, Nevada
|align=left|
|-
|Win
|
|align=left| Sherman "Caribbean Tank" Williams
|UD
|10
|20/10/2002
|align=left| Emerald Queen Casino, Tacoma, Washington
|align=left|
|-
|Win
|
|align=left| James "Hurricane" Walton
|MD
|10
|07/06/2002
|align=left| Caesars Palace, Las Vegas, Nevada
|align=left|
|-
|Win
|
|align=left| Talmadge Griffis
|UD
|8
|17/03/2002
|align=left| Gold Country Casino, Oroville, California
|align=left|
|-
|Win
|
|align=left| Willie Chapman
|UD
|8
|12/01/2002
|align=left| Flamingo Laughlin, Laughlin, Nevada
|align=left|
|-
|Win
|
|align=left| Sean Williams
|UD
|6
|13/10/2001
|align=left| Stateline, Nevada
|align=left|
|-
|Win
|
|align=left| Todd Diggs
|UD
|6
|28/09/2001
|align=left| Caesars Palace, Las Vegas, Nevada
|align=left|
|-
|Win
|
|align=left| Charles "Buddy" Hatcher
|UD
|6
|25/08/2001
|align=left| Flamingo Laughlin, Laughlin, Nevada
|align=left|
|-
|Win
|
|align=left| Israel Carlos Garcia
|UD
|6
|29/04/2001
|align=left| Club Amazura, Jamaica, Queens
|align=left|
|-
|Loss
|
|align=left| Owen Beck
|UD
|6
|07/10/2000
|align=left| Mohegan Sun, Uncasville, Connecticut
|align=left|
|-
|Win
|
|align=left| Larry Carlisle
|UD
|6
|29/06/2000
|align=left| Hammerstein Ballroom, New York City
|align=left|
|-
|Win
|
|align=left| Lazaro Almanza
|UD
|6
|27/04/2000
|align=left| Hammerstein Ballroom, New York City
|align=left|
|-
|Win
|
|align=left| Marcus Johnson
|TKO
|4
|31/03/2000
|align=left| Hammerstein Ballroom, New York City
|align=left|
|-
|Win
|
|align=left| Kevin Rosier
|PTS
|4
|24/02/2000
|align=left| Hammerstein Ballroom, New York City
|align=left|
|-
|Win
|
|align=left| Willie Kyles
|TKO
|1
|27/01/2000
|align=left| Hammerstein Ballroom, New York City
|align=left|
|-
|Win
|
|align=left| Michael Morrell
|KO
|2
|29/07/1999
|align=left| Atlanta, Georgia
|align=left|
|-
|Win
|
|align=left| Drexie James
|KO
|6
|18/06/1999
|align=left| Old West Palm Beach National Guard Armory, West Palm Beach, Florida
|align=left|
|-
|Win
|
|align=left| Miguel Otero Ocasio
|UD
|6
|09/04/1999
|align=left| Sons of Italy, West Palm Beach, Florida
|align=left|
|-
|Win
|
|align=left| Edward Slater
|UD
|4
|12/03/1999
|align=left| Venice Sports Center, Venice, Florida
|align=left|
|-
|Win
|
|align=left| Essene Felciano
|TKO
|3
|20/11/1998
|align=left| Ocala Livestock Pavilion, Ocala, Florida
|align=left|
|-
|Win
|
|align=left| Eddy Martinez
|UD
|4
|07/11/1998
|align=left| Sons of Italy, Lake Worth, Florida
|align=left|
|-
|Win
|
|align=left| Sam Williams
|UD
|4
|12/09/1998
|align=left| Sons of Italy, Lake Worth, Florida
|align=left|
|}

External links
 

Living people
1975 births
Boxers from New York City
Sportspeople from Brooklyn
Heavyweight boxers
African-American boxers
American male boxers
21st-century African-American sportspeople
20th-century African-American sportspeople